Plicaria carbonaria is a species of apothecial fungus belonging to the family Pezizaceae. This is a common European fungus of burnt ground, appearing from spring to autumn as dark brown to black cups up to 3 cm in diameter.

References

Plicaria carbonaria at Species Fungorum

Pezizaceae
Fungi described in 1870
Taxa named by Karl Wilhelm Gottlieb Leopold Fuckel